Ku. Pa. Krishnan is an Indian politician and agriculture minister of Tamil Nadu from 1991 to 1996 
. He was a member of the Tamil Nadu Legislative Assembly from the Alangudi constituency between 2011 and 2016. He represents the Anna Dravida Munnetra Kazhagam party.

References 

Members of the Tamil Nadu Legislative Assembly
All India Anna Dravida Munnetra Kazhagam politicians
Living people
Year of birth missing (living people)